Malacosarcus  is a monotypic genus of pricklefish found in the western central Pacific Ocean and possibly the northeast Atlantic Ocean at depths of from .  It's only known species is 
Malacosarcus macrostoma.

References

Stephanoberycidae
Monotypic ray-finned fish genera
Marine fish genera
Taxa named by Albert Günther